The House of Wettin is a dynasty of German kings, prince-electors, dukes, and counts that once ruled territories in the present-day German states of Saxony, Saxony-Anhalt and Thuringia. The dynasty is one of the oldest in Europe, and its origins can be traced back to the town of Wettin, Saxony-Anhalt. The Wettins gradually rose to power within the Holy Roman Empire. Members of the family became the rulers of several medieval states, starting with the Saxon Eastern March in 1030. Other states they gained were Meissen in 1089, Thuringia in 1263, and Saxony in 1423. These areas cover large parts of Central Germany as a cultural area of Germany.

The family divided into two ruling branches in 1485 by the Treaty of Leipzig: the Ernestine and Albertine branches. The older Ernestine branch played a key role during the Protestant Reformation. Many ruling monarchs outside Germany were later tied to its cadet branch, the House of Saxe-Coburg and Gotha. The Albertine branch, while less prominent, ruled most of Saxony and played a part in Polish history.

Agnates of the House of Wettin have, at various times, ascended the thrones of the United Kingdom, Portugal, Bulgaria, Poland, Saxony, Mexico and Belgium. Only the Belgian line retains their throne today.

All undisputably  members, or those without morganatic marriages,  are more than 70 years old.

Origins: Wettin of Saxony 

The oldest member of the House of Wettin who is known for certain is Theodoric I of Wettin, also known as Dietrich, Thiedericus, and  Thierry I of Liesgau (died c. 982). He was most probably based in the Liesgau (located at the western edge of the Harz). Around 1000, the family acquired Wettin Castle, which was originally built by the local Slavic tribes (see Sorbs), after which they named themselves. Wettin Castle is located in Wettin in the Hassegau (or Hosgau) on the Saale River. Around 1030, the Wettin family received the Eastern March as a fief.

The prominence of the Wettins in the Slavic Saxon Eastern March (or Ostmark) caused Emperor Henry IV to invest them with the March of Meissen as a fief in 1089. The family advanced over the course of the Middle Ages: in 1263, they inherited the landgraviate of Thuringia (although without Hesse) and in 1423, they were invested with the Duchy of Saxony, centred at Wittenberg, thus becoming one of the prince-electors of the Holy Roman Empire.

Ernestine and Albertine Wettins 

The family split into two ruling branches in 1485 when the sons of Frederick II, Elector of Saxony divided the territories hitherto ruled jointly. The elder son Ernest, who had succeeded his father as Prince-elector, received the territories assigned to the Elector (Electorate of Saxony) and Thuringia, while his younger brother Albert obtained the March of Meissen, which he ruled from Dresden. As Albert ruled under the title of "Duke of Saxony", his possessions were also known as Ducal Saxony.

Ernestines
The older Ernestine branch remained predominant until 1547 and played an important role in the beginnings of the Protestant Reformation. Frederick III (Friedrich der Weise) appointed Martin Luther (1512) and Philipp Melanchthon (1518) to the University of Wittenberg, which he had established in 1502.

The Ernestine predominance ended in the Schmalkaldic War (1546/7), which pitted the Protestant Schmalkaldic League against the Emperor Charles V. Although itself Lutheran, the Albertine branch rallied to the Emperor's cause. Charles V had promised Moritz the rights to the electorship. After the Battle of Mühlberg, Johann Friedrich der Großmütige, had to cede territory (including Wittenberg) and the electorship to his cousin Moritz. Although imprisoned, Johann Friedrich was able to plan a new university. It was established by his three sons on 19 March 1548 as the Höhere Landesschule at Jena. On 15 August 1557, Emperor Ferdinand I awarded it the status of university.

The Ernestine line was thereafter restricted to Thuringia and its dynastic unity swiftly crumbled, dividing into a number of smaller states, the Ernestine duchies. Nevertheless, with Ernst der Fromme, Duke of Saxe-Gotha (1601–1675), the house gave rise to an important early-modern ruler who was ahead of his time in supporting the education of his people and in improving administration. In the 18th century, Karl August, Duke of Saxe-Weimar-Eisenach, established what was to become known as Weimar Classicism at his court in Weimar, notably by bringing Johann Wolfgang von Goethe there.

It was only in the 19th century that one of the many Ernestine branches, the House of Saxe-Coburg and Gotha, regained importance through marriages as the "stud of Europe", by ascending the thrones of Belgium (in 1831), Portugal (1853–1910), Bulgaria (1908–1946) and the United Kingdom (1901-present, though the relevant marriage had taken place in 1840) and also providing a consort to the future Habsburg Emperor of Mexico (1857).

Residences of Ernestine branches

Albertines

The junior Albertine branch maintained most of the territorial integrity of Saxony, preserving it as a significant power in the region, and used small appanage fiefs for its cadet branches, few of which survived for significant lengths of time. The Ernestine Wettins, on the other hand, repeatedly subdivided their territory, creating an intricate patchwork of small duchies and counties in Thuringia.

The Albertine Wettins ruled as Electors (1547–1806) and Kings of Saxony (1806–1918), and also played a role in Polish history – two Wettins were Kings of Poland (between 1697–1763) and a third ruled the Duchy of Warsaw (1807–1814) as a satellite of Napoleon I. After the Napoleonic Wars, the Albertine branch lost about 40% of its lands (the economically less-developed northern parts of the old Electorate of Saxony) to Prussia, restricting it to a territory coextensive with the modern Saxony (see Final Act of the Congress of Vienna Act IV: Treaty between Prussia and Saxony 18 May 1815). Frederick Augustus III lost his throne in the German Revolution of 1918.

The role of current head of the Albertine "House of Saxony" is claimed by his great-grandson Prince Rüdiger of Saxony, Duke of Saxony, Margrave of Meissen (born 23 December 1953).  However, the headship of Prince Rüdiger is contested by his second cousin, Alexander (born 1954), son of Roberto Afif (later by change of name Mr Gessaphe) and Princess Maria Anna of Saxony, a sister of the childless former head of the Albertines, Maria Emanuel, Margrave of Meissen (died 2012), who had adopted his nephew and granted him the name Prince of Saxony, contrary to the rules of male descent under the Salic Law. Both are however not recognized by the Nobility Archive in Marburg, nor by the Conference of the Formerly Ruling Houses in Germany – Prince Rüdiger because his father Timo was expelled from the House of Wettin, and Prince Alexander because he is not of agnatic noble descent (his father was Roberto Afif from Lebanon). Consequently, the Albertine branch of the House of Wettin is officially treated by the German nobility as extinct in its legal succession-line.

Albertine Electors and Kings of Saxony

Residences of the Albertine branch

The House of Saxe-Coburg and Gotha 

The senior (Ernestine) branch of the House of Wettin lost the electorship to the Albertine line in 1547, but retained its holdings in Thuringia, dividing the area into a number of smaller states. One of the resulting Ernestine houses, known as Saxe-Coburg-Saalfeld until 1826 and as Saxe-Coburg and Gotha after that, went on to contribute kings of Belgium (from 1831) and Bulgaria (1908–1946), as well as furnishing consorts to queens regnant of Portugal (Prince Ferdinand) and the United Kingdom (Prince Albert), and the  Emperor of Mexico (Carlota of Mexico) Thus, the British and Portuguese thrones became possessions of persons who belonged to the House of Wettin for a time.

From King George I to Queen Victoria, the British Royal family was  called the House of Hanover, being a junior branch of the House of Brunswick-Lüneburg and thus part of the dynasty of the Guelphs. In the late 19th century, Queen Victoria charged the College of Arms in England to determine the correct personal surname of her late husband, Prince Albert of Saxe-Coburg and Gotha—and, thus, the proper surname of the royal family upon the accession of her son. After extensive research, they concluded that it was Wettin, but this name was never used, either by the Queen or by her son (King Edward VII) or by her grandson (King George V); they were simply Kings of the House of "Saxe-Coburg-Gotha".

Severe anti-German sentiment during World War I (1914-1918) led some influential members of the British public (especially radical Republicans such as H. G. Wells) to question the loyalty of the royal family. Advisors to King George V searched for an acceptable surname for the British royal family, but Wettin was rejected as "unsuitably comic". An Order in Council legally changed the name of the British royal family to "Windsor" (originally suggested by Lord Stamfordham) in 1917.

Residences of the family

Branches and titles of the House of Wettin and its agnatic descent

Early Wettins
 Counts of Wettin
 Margraves of Landsberg
 Margraves of Meissen
 Margraves of Lusatia
 Dukes of Saxony, Landgraves of Thuringia
 Electors of Saxony and Arch-Marshals of the Holy Roman Empire

Ernestines
 Electors of Saxony and Arch-Marshals of the Holy Roman Empire (1464–1547)

Existing Ernestine branches

Branch of Saxe-Weimar-Eisenach
 Saxe-Weimar-Eisenach, extant lines all shared last common ancestor in the person of William Ernest, Grand Duke of Saxe-Weimar-Eisenach. However there are only two members of this line left, Michael, Prince of Saxe-Weimar-Eisenach and Prince Bernhard of Saxe-Weimar-Eisenach. Both were born in 1946. Since Prince Michael has no sons, and Prince Wilhelm Ernst, whose only son Prince Georg-Constantin (13 April 1977 – 9 June 2018), a banker who was married but without issue, was killed in a horse riding accident on 9 June 2018 while riding with Jean Christophe Iseux von Pfetten. Therefore, the Grand Ducal House of Saxe-Weimar-Eisenach will most likely become extinct in the male line. These two represent the last non-morganatic descendants of William, Duke of Saxe-Weimar
 Illegitimate line of Barons of Heygendorff, four males left

Branch of Saxe-Meiningen
 Saxe-Meiningen lines all shared common descent from Georg II, Duke of Saxe-Meiningen
 Morganatic lines from Ernst, Prince of Saxe-Meiningen
 Morganatic line from Bernhard, Prince of Saxe-Meiningen
 Legitimate line from Bernhard, Prince of Saxe-Meiningen of whom only Prince Frederick Konrad of Saxe-Meiningen (Born on 14 April 1952) is still alive today.

In the very likely event of the extinction of these two senior branches, the sole represantation of the Ernestine Wettins will pass to the descendants of Francis, Duke of Saxe-Coburg-Saalfeld, who are the present Saxe-Coburg-Gothas led by Andreas, Prince of Saxe-Coburg and Gotha (b. 21 March 1943), the House of Windsor, the Royal Family of Belgium and the Royal Family of Bulgaria. Francis and his nephew Ludwig Frederick Emil von Coburg are also ancestors to morganatic lines.
 Saxe-Coburg-Saalfeld, last common descent from Francis Josias, Duke of Saxe-Coburg-Saalfeld, further divided into:
 Saxe-Coburg-Gotha, last common descent from Francis, Duke of Saxe-Coburg-Saalfeld, further divided into:
 House of Windsor, last common descent from Albert, Prince Consort of the United Kingdom, as in 1863 Edward VII and his son, the future George V renounced his succession rights to the duchy Saxe-Coburg-Gotha, the succession fell into the line of the Duke of Albany.
 Gloucester line Prince Richard, Duke of Gloucester
 Kentian Line, from Prince George, Duke of Kent
 Mainline (Albany) Saxe-Coburg-Gotha, from Charles Edward, Duke of Saxe-Coburg and Gotha who until 1919 was the Duke of Albany
 House of Saxe-Coburg and Gotha-Koháry, last common descent from Prince August of Saxe-Coburg and Gotha
 Morganatic descendants from Prince Philipp of Saxe-Coburg and Gotha (1901–1985)
 Bulgarian royal family, all living members are descended from Simeon Saxe-Coburg-Gotha
 House of Belgium, all living members share common descent from Albert II of Belgium. However as absolute primogeniture is in effect in Belgium, if and on the ascencion of Princess Elisabeth, Duchess of Brabant to the throne, the ruling house of Belgium will no longer considered agnates to the House of Wettin
Eppinghoven, illegitimate agnatic branch to the House of Belgium from Leopold I of Belgium and Arcadie Claret
 Morganatic line of Rohmann, from Prince Josias of Saxe-Coburg-Saalfeld marriage to a commoner, Therese Stroffeck

Extinct Ernestine branches
 Dukes of Saxe-Coburg
 Dukes of Saxe-Coburg-Saalfeld
 Dukes of Saxe-Altenburg (first line of Altenburg)
 Dukes of Saxe-Gotha-Altenburg (second line of Altenburg)
 Dukes of Saxe-Hildburghausen, then Dukes of Saxe-Altenburg (third line of Altenburg)
 Dukes of Saxe-Weimar
 Dukes of Saxe-Eisenach
 Dukes of Saxe-Coburg-Eisenach
 Dukes of Saxe-Jena
 Dukes of Saxe-Gotha
 Dukes of Saxe-Eisenberg
 Dukes of Saxe-Marksuhl
 Dukes of Saxe-Römhild
 Kings of Portugal and the Algarves (House of Braganza-Saxe-Coburg and Gotha)

Albertines

 Margraves of Meissen
 Grand Master of the Teutonic Order (1498–1510)
 Electors of Saxony and Arch-Marshals of the Holy Roman Empire (1547–1806)
 Kings of Poland and Grand Dukes of Lithuania (1697-1763)
 Duke of Courland and Semigallia (1758–1763)
 Duke of Teschen (1766-1822)
 Kings of Saxony (1806–1918), currently Prince/Princess of Saxony and Duke/Duchess of Saxony, with the head of the family also Margrave of Meissen
 Duke of Warsaw (1807–1815)

Existing Albertine branch
 Saxe-Gessaphe

Extinct Albertine branches
 Dukes of Saxe-Zeitz
 Dukes of Saxe-Merseburg
 Dukes of Saxe-Weissenfels

Family tree of the House of Wettin

Coats of arms 

For an extensive treatment of the coats of arms, see: Coat of arms of Saxony

or in French: Armorial de la maison de Wettin

See also 
 Rulers of Saxony, a list containing many Wettins
 Wettin, Saxony-Anhalt, the city from which the Wettin dynasty originated
 Coinage of Saxony
 Free Saxony, monarchist political party
 Saxon Renaissance, regional type of architecture

References

External links 

 House of Wettin – European Heraldry page
 Timeline at the website of the State of Saxony
 Website of Rüdiger, Margrave of Meissen 
 Website of Albert Prinz von Sachsen 

 

German noble families
10th-century establishments in the Holy Roman Empire